Borna may refer to:

Places
 Borna, Leipzig, a town in Saxony, Germany
 Borna, a subdivision of Bahretal municipality, Saxony, German
 Borna Dam, an earthfill dam on Borna river near Ambejogai, Beed district, Maharashtra, India

People
 Borna (duke), the Duke of Dalmatia c. 810–821, a vassal of the Frankish Empire
 Borna (given name), a Croatian masculine given name
 Bertin Borna (1930–2007), a Beninese politician

Other uses
 Borna disease, an infectious neurological syndrome
 Bornaviridae,  a family of viruses associated with  Borna disease
 Borna disease virus
 Borna language (Democratic Republic of the Congo), a spurious language description now retired from ISO 639-3
 Borna language (Ethiopia), a North Omotic language spoken in western Ethiopia
 Borna snakehead, Channa amphibeus, an extremely rare species of snakehead fish

See also
Boma language
Borne, Overijssel, a municipality and a town in the Netherlands